Nicholas Mark Cummins (born 5 October 1987), known by his nickname The Honey Badger, is an Australian former professional rugby union player and television personality. He played for the Western Force in Super Rugby and for Coca-Cola Red Sparks in the Japanese Top League. Cummins has represented Australia in international matches for both the Australian Sevens team and the Australian rugby team. His usual position was wing.

Cummins is also known by his nickname The Honey Badger, bestowed on him after he drew inspiration from the fierce nature of the honey badger and attempted to think like the animal in defence. He is also well known for starring in the sixth season of The Bachelor Australia.

Early life
Cummins was born in Port Macquarie, New South Wales. One of eight siblings, he identifies as a Queenslander as he was raised in Logan City in Brisbane's south by his father Mark Cummins, who was a single dad. He attended St Francis' College in Crestmead, where he starred in the swimming pool and on the athletics track, as well as on the rugby field.

In 2005, Cummins represented Queensland at the Australian Schools Rugby Championships in Canberra. He moved to Sydney in 2006, where he joined the Randwick rugby club and played for their grand final-winning Colts side that year.

Rugby career
In 2007, Cummins was selected for the Australian Sevens squad and he was the top try scorer for the team at the IRB Sevens World Series. Later that year, he moved to Perth after signing a two-year contract with the Western Force.

Cummins played for the Perth Spirit team that reached the semi-final stage of the Australian Rugby Championship in 2007. He made his Super Rugby debut for the Western Force in 2008, starting in the first round against the Sharks in Durban.

In 2009, Cummins was invited to the Wallabies training camp prior to the northern Spring Tour, although injury prevented his involvement on that tour.

In 2010, he was selected for the Australian Barbarians and played in two home matches against England. He was then selected in Australia's 28-man squad that travelled to South Africa as part of the 2010 Tri-Nations series, although he wasn't required to play. Later that year, Cummins went to the Commonwealth Games Sevens tournament in Delhi, where he played in Australia's silver medal-winning team.

In 2012, Cummins was selected for the Australia squad for the inaugural Rugby Championship. He made his Test debut on 6 October 2012, and played on the wing in the Wallabies 25–19 win over Argentina in Rosario.

On 4 July 2014 it was announced that Cummins would be released early from his Western Force and Australian Rugby Union contracts on compassionate grounds. He announced he would be moving to Japan due to health concerns in his family. He signed a new contract with Japanese club the Coca-Cola Red Sparks.

In 2016, Cummins won his first Championship outside of junior rugby when he came on as a non-scoring substitute in the final of the amateur Norwegian Rugby Union Championship for Stavanger RK in their win against Oslo RK.

Television and advertising roles
Because of Cummins' broad Australian accent and very Australian attitude, he has featured in several ad campaigns as an "Aussie Larrikin" character. Cummins has been the face of Tradie underwear and workwear for men since August 2015, as well as featuring in small TV campaigns for Head & Shoulders shampoo in 2014 and beer company Iron Jack over Christmas in late 2017.

In October 2017, he was an ambassador for Tourism Australia, in a campaign which also featured Australian actor Lincoln Lewis. Cummins playfully took aim at Tourism Australia ambassador, Chris Hemsworth, defending claims he was not as big a name as the Hollywood-based Australian actor.

Nick is also the presenter of the National Geographic program Meanwhile In Australia. A documentary series in which he travels around Australia gathering stories of people and places along the road.

On 14 March 2018, it was confirmed by Network Ten that Cummins would star in the sixth season of The Bachelor Australia in 2018.

Cummins appeared as one of the hosts for Team Australia on the third season of Ultimate Beastmaster, a Netflix original series.

In 2020, it was announced Cummins would be participating the Seven Network's reality program SAS Australia. Cummins was one of three recruits to pass selection along with Merrick Watts and Sabrina Frederick.

Publications

Super Rugby statistics

References

External links 
 Official website
 
 

1987 births
Australian rugby union players
Australia international rugby union players
Western Force players
Rugby union centres
Rugby union wings
Living people
Coca-Cola Red Sparks players
Australian expatriate rugby union players
Expatriate rugby union players in Japan
Australia international rugby sevens players
Australian expatriate sportspeople in Japan
Commonwealth Games silver medallists for Australia
Rugby sevens players at the 2010 Commonwealth Games
Male rugby sevens players
Commonwealth Games medallists in rugby sevens
Commonwealth Games rugby sevens players of Australia
Sportspeople from Logan, Queensland
Bachelor Nation contestants
Rugby union players from New South Wales
Medallists at the 2010 Commonwealth Games